The 2017 National Arena League season was the inaugural season of the National Arena League (NAL).  Playing with eight teams spread across the eastern and southern United States (with one team in Mexico), the league's regular season kicked off on March 17, 2017, when the Columbus Lions hosted the Jacksonville Sharks and lost 41–56.  The regular season ended 14 weeks later on June 17, 2017, with the Sharks hosting the Monterrey Steel and the Lions visiting the Georgia Firebirds.  The playoffs were held in two rounds, with the top seed hosting the fourth seed and the second seed hosting the third seed, with the winners of these games facing in the 2017 NAL Championship hosted by the highest remaining seed.

Teams
For 2017, the NAL will consist of eight teams in a single-table format (no divisions or conferences).  Four of the teams (Corpus Christi Rage, Dayton Wolfpack, High Country Grizzlies and Monterrey Steel) are playing their inaugural seasons, with three teams (Columbus Lions, Georgia Firebirds, Lehigh Valley Steelhawks) joining from the now-defunct American Indoor Football, and one team (Jacksonville Sharks) joining from the Arena Football League.

Each team was scheduled for 12 games (6 home and 6 away) with 2 bye weeks during the season. However, in order to satisfy their arena contract from their time in AFL, the Jacksonville Sharks were given eight home games, while the Corpus Christi Rage and Dayton Wolfpack were each only given five home games to balance the schedules. This was changed again when the Wolfpack were apparently unable to secure an arena lease, despite announcing they would play at the Nutter Center. Previously signed players reported on social media before the season that all players had been cut from the team, and as of February 20, all their home games were canceled.

Other cancelled games
The May 20 Firebirds vs. Rage matchup was cancelled by the league, which took ownership of both teams at the time, as they saw no reason to pay for the Firebirds' travel cost for a game between both of their teams.
The June 16 Grizzles vs. Rage matchup was cancelled by the Rage as a result of the team suspending operations during their scheduled bye week.

Teams

Standings

Playoffs

Awards

Individual season awards

1st Team All-NAL

2nd Team All-NAL

References

See also 
2017 Indoor Football League season